Southroads Mall is an enclosed shopping mall at 1001 Fort Crook Road in Bellevue, Nebraska.  Fort Crook Road was U.S. Route 75 until the early 1990s, replaced by the Kennedy Freeway.

History
Developed by the Brandeis Investment Corp., Southroads opened in 1966 with an Omaha-based department store, Brandeis, and JCPenney as anchors. The mall has  of retail space, which was modeled after the success of Omaha's Crossroads Mall, which was also developed by Brandeis. Southroads was developed within the Southroads Complex near a Sears, which had been open since 1964.

Originally, Southroads Mall was only a one level mall in the beginning but later on, the bottom level of the mall came to be. The remodel would also include a food court, a movie theater, an expansion of both anchors, an elevator, 2 escalators and stairs built on both ends in the mall. It also received a heavy makeover on the inside and outside with a new mall area being built connected outwards.

Brandeis was purchased by Younkers in 1987, and converted to the Younkers name, but the store was closed in 1996. The JCPenney anchor was converted to a clearance center in 1999  and was closed in 2003.

As retail outlets closed, retail space was converted to office space. TD Ameritrade, headquartered out of Omaha, began leasing space at the mall in 1998, eventually taking over the former Brandeis/Younkers space. PayPal leased space in the former JCPenney, along with CoSentry. TD Ameritrade began shifting employees from Southroads in 2011 and consolidated their offices in West Omaha.

Notable local businesses
John’s Grecian Delight, Southroads Mall has been home to a host of notable local business including John's Grecian Delight, a fixture in the community since 1983.

References

External links
 DeadMalls.com article on Southroads
 Mall Floor Plans
 YouTube.com - video - The Rise and Fall of Southroads Mall - (2011)
 The Official Southroads Mall Facebook Page 

Buildings and structures in Bellevue, Nebraska
Defunct shopping malls in the United States
Shopping malls in Nebraska
Shopping malls established in 1966